William Spenser (died 24 September 1589) was an English Roman Catholic priest. He is a Catholic martyr, beatified in 1987.

Life
Spenser was born at Ghisburn, Yorkshire.  His maternal uncle, William Horn, who signed for the Rectory of Cornwell, Oxfordshire, in 1559, sent him in 1573 to Trinity College, Oxford, where he became Fellow in 1579 and M.A. in 1580. There, convinced of the truth of Catholicism, he used his position to influence his pupils in that direction; but he delayed his conversion till 1582, when, with four other Trinity men (John Appletree, B.A., already a priest; William Warford, M.A. and Fellow, afterwards a Jesuit; Anthony Shirley, M.A. and Fellow, afterwards a priest; and John Fixer, B.A., afterwards a priest), he embarked from the Isle of Wight.

They landed near Cherbourg, arriving at Reims, 2 November. Received into the Catholic Church five days later, he was ordained sub-deacon and deacon at Laon by the bishop, Valentine Douglas, 7 April 1583, and priest at Reims by the Cardinal Archbishop Louis de Guise, 24 September.

He was sent on the English mission 29 August 1584. He effected the reconciliation of his parents and his uncle (the latter was living as a Catholic priest in 1593), and afterwards voluntarily immured himself in York Castle to help the prisoners there.

He was condemned under 27 Elizabeth, c. 2, for being a priest, and executed at York. With him was executed a layman, Robert Hardesty, who had given him shelter.

References

Attribution
 The entry cites:
John Hungerford Pollen, Acts of the English Martyrs (London, 1891), 273–8;
English Martyrs 1584- 1603 (London, 1908), 34, 35; 
Thomas Francis Knox, Douay Diaries (London, 1878); 
and, for William Horn, see 
Henry Gee, Elizabethan Clergy (Oxford, 1898), 119; 
Public Record Office, S. P. Dom. Add. Eliz., XXXII, 64.

1589 deaths
16th-century English Roman Catholic priests
English beatified people
16th-century venerated Christians
Year of birth unknown
Clergy from Yorkshire
16th-century Roman Catholic martyrs
Fellows of Trinity College, Oxford
Alumni of Trinity College, Oxford
People executed under Elizabeth I
Executed English people
Eighty-five martyrs of England and Wales